Epsom and Ewell Cottage Hospital is a small hospital in West Park Road, Horton Lane, Epsom, Surrey. It is managed by CSH Surrey.

History
The hospital has its origins in a facility established at Pembroke Cottages at Pikes Hill in April 1873. It moved to Hawthorn Place in 1877 and to Alexandra Road in 1889. Emily Davison died at the hospital after being hit by King George V's horse Anmer at the 1913 Derby when she walked onto the track during the race.

The hospital joined the National Health Service in 1948. Although the hospital officially closed in 1988, the facility is still used for the physiotherapy and rehabilitation.

References

Sources
 
 

Hospital buildings completed in 1889
Hospitals in Surrey
Epsom
Cottage hospitals
NHS hospitals in England